Vladan Spasojević (born 11 October 1980) is a Serbian football midfielder.

Born in Kosovska Mitrovica (SAP Kosovo, SR Serbia) he started his career with FK Bane, moving in 2003 to top league FK Borac Čačak where he stayed until 2008 when he moved to another Serbian SuperLiga club, FK Jagodina. After two seasons he moved abroad to Slovakia signing with MFK Košice but after six months he returned to Serbia and signed with FK Novi Pazar being one of the numerous signings that the club made that winter with the purpose of achieving promotion to the top league for the first time in their history.

External links
 Vladan Spasojević at MFK Košice official website. 
 Vladan Spasojević at Srbijafudbal. 
 Vladan Spasojević Stats at Utakmica.rs
 

1980 births
Living people
Sportspeople from Mitrovica, Kosovo
Kosovo Serbs
Serbian footballers
FK Trepča players
FK Borac Čačak players
FK Jagodina players
FC VSS Košice players
Association football midfielders
Serbian expatriate footballers
Expatriate footballers in Slovakia
Serbian expatriate sportspeople in Slovakia
Serbian First League players
Serbian SuperLiga players
Slovak Super Liga players
FK Novi Pazar players
FK Mladost Lučani players
FK Kolubara players